Winning the Futurity is a 1926 American silent drama film directed by Scott R. Dunlap and starring Cullen Landis, Clara Horton and Ernest Hilliard.

Cast
 Cullen Landis as Luke Allen 
 Clara Horton as Nelle Barkley 
 Ernest Hilliard as Chet Kildare 
 Bruce Covington as Colonel Barkley 
 Pat Harmon as Brett Marshall 
 Otis Harlan as Tom Giles 
 George Reed as Uncle Mose 
 Eugenie Besserer as Mary Allen

References

Bibliography
 Munden, Kenneth White. The American Film Institute Catalog of Motion Pictures Produced in the United States, Part 1. University of California Press, 1997.

External links

1926 films
1926 drama films
Silent American drama films
Films directed by Scott R. Dunlap
American silent feature films
1920s English-language films
American black-and-white films
1920s American films